The Iranian City and Village Councils election of 2006 took place on December 15, 2006. People elected representatives for City and Village Councils, who in their turn elected the mayors.

The elections happened on the same day as the election for the Assembly of Experts.

Candidates
Every city and village in the country elected representatives. Iran's 46.5 million eligible voters elected about 233,000 candidates for more than 113,000 city and rural council posts.

Results

According The Financial Times, partial results about cities other than Tehran indicated:
 In Isfahan, Ahmadinejad's supporters won 3 out of 11 seats
 In Tabriz, Ahmadinejad's supporters won 4 out of 16 seats
 In Qom, Ahmadinejad's supporters won 3 out of 9 seats
 In Shiraz, Ahmadinejad's supporters won 1 out of 11 seats
 In Ardabil, Ahmadinejad's supporters won 1 out of 9 seats

Safdar Hosseini, the provincial campaign coordinator for the Reformists Coalition, claimed that the reformists had won most of the 1,524 seats for municipal councils in 265 cities and that most of the independents have "reformist leanings". According to him, the results were as follows:

The results in provincial capitals were reported by Iranian media as follows:

Controversy about the results
The reformist candidates protested Ministry of Interior delays in announcing provisional results, and its failure to announce provisional results for two days after the end of the election. This contravened normal practice, where results were announced gradually as vote counting was under way. The candidates also claimed fraud in counting the votes, mentioning lost vote boxes and newly found boxes that reported zero votes for the reformist candidates.

References

External links
 'Iranian President suffers defeat in local elections', CityMayors, 21 December 2006
Impressive Performance of Women in City Council Elections

2006 elections in Iran
2006
December 2006 events in Asia